Emblemariopsis leptocirris is a species of chaenopsid blenny found in coral reefs in the western central Atlantic ocean.

References
 Stephens, J.S., Jr., 1970 (1 June) Seven new chaenopsid blennies from the western Atlantic. Copeia 1970 (no. 2): 280–309.

leptocirris
Fish described in 1970